The Laurentian Bank of Canada (LBC) is a Schedule 1 bank that operates primarily in the province of Quebec, with commercial and business banking offices located in Ontario, Alberta, British Columbia, and Nova Scotia. LBC's Institution Number (or routing number) is 039.

The institution was established as the Montreal City and District Savings Bank in 1846. Shares for the bank were publicly listed on the Montreal Stock Exchange in 1965 and the Toronto Stock Exchange in 1983. In 1987, the institution was renamed the Laurentian Bank of Canada.

It is the only bank in North America to have had a labour union, some positions becoming unionized in 1967, with the rest of non-managerial positions joining decades later. In 2017, there was a failed attempt by the bank to decertify the Canadian Office and Professional Employees Union, but a majority of workers voted for union de-certification in March 2021, leading the Canada Industrial Relations Board to revoke the union's certification in April 2021.

History

LBC's history began in 1846 with the founding of the Banque d'Épargne de la Cité et du District de Montréal, or Montreal City and District Savings Bank, by Bishop Ignace Bourget and a group of 15 prominent people from Montreal, Quebec. The bank's 60 honorary directors included Louis-Hippolyte Lafontaine, Louis-Joseph Papineau, and Sir George-Étienne Cartier.

In 1965, the bank listed its shares on the Montreal Stock Exchange.

In 1974, the bank installed an ATM system called "Bancaide". Primitive by the standards of the following decade, the nonetheless revolutionary machine dispensed cash 24 hours a day.

In 1980, the Montreal City and District Savings Bank obtained the right to expand its operations throughout Canada. This expansion led to the institution listing its shares on the Toronto Stock Exchange three years later, and in 1987, the bank was renamed Laurentian Bank of Canada. In 1988, after more than a century (1871–1988) at 176 Saint-Jacques Street, the institution's head office moved to McGill College Avenue in Montreal.

In 1993, the bank acquired General Trust Corporation and purchased most of the Société Nationale de Fiducie's assets from the brokerage firm BLC Rousseau, thus creating Laurentian Bank Securities (LBS).

In 2000, it acquired all Sun Life Trust Company stock in a transaction that resulted in the creation of the new B2B Trust subsidiary, now known as B2B Bank.

In 2016, the bank relocated all of its Montreal offices, including its headquarters on McGill College Avenue, into a single building on 1360 Rene Levesque Boulevard West in Montreal.

In 2020, Rania Llewellyn was named president and CEO replacing acting CEO Stephane Therrien who had been serving as president and chief executive since Francois Desjardins retired in June 2020.

Mergers and acquisitions
The bank merged with Eaton Trust Company (in 1988), purchased Standard Trust's assets (1991), acquired La Financière Coopérants Prêts-Épargne Inc., and Guardian Trust Company in Ontario (1992), acquired General Trust Corporation in Ontario, and purchased some Société Nationale de Fiducie assets and the brokerage firm BLC Rousseau (1993).

In 1993, the Desjardins-Laurentian Financial Corporation became the new majority shareholder of Laurentian Bank of Canada, following the merging of the Laurentian Group Corporation with the Desjardins Group. The bank purchased the Manulife Bank of Canada's banking service network and the assets of Prenor Trust Company of Canada in 1994.

In 1995, the bank acquired 30 branches of the North American Trust Company.

In 1996, one of its subsidiaries acquired the parent corporation of Trust Prêt et Revenu du Canada. A few months later, the withdrawal of its main shareholder, Desjardins-Laurentian Financial Corporation, prompted the Laurentian Bank to become a Schedule 1 Bank under the Bank Act, on par with all the other large Canadian banks.

In December of 2021, Laurentian Bank announced that they were forming a partnership with Brim Financial. This partnership will help the bank to transform and enhance the customer experience for its suite of Visa products. Customers will now have access to digital onboarding and instant adjudication, instant virtual card issuance, mobile wallet functionality and a wide range of self serve card management options. 

Laurentian Bank and Brim plan to bring the new experience to the market in mid 2022.

Membership
LBC is a member of the Canadian Bankers Association and registered member with the Canada Deposit Insurance Corporation, a federal agency insuring deposits at all of Canada's chartered banks. It is also a member of Interac.

See also

 List of banks and credit unions in Canada

References

External links

 

 
Companies listed on the Toronto Stock Exchange
Banks of Canada
Companies based in Montreal
Mortgage lenders of Canada
Banks established in 1846
1846 establishments in Quebec
Canadian companies established in 1846